Jahr is a village in Iran.

Jahr or jähr may also refer to:

People with the surname
 Adolf Jahr (1893–1964), Swedish film actor
 Arno Jahr (1890–1943), German general during World War II
 Ernst Håkon Jahr (born 1948), Norwegian linguist
 Gottlieb Heinrich Georg Jahr (1800–1875), German-French physician and pioneer of classical homeopathy
 Gunnar Jahr (1884–1968), Norwegian businessperson, sports official and politician
 John Jahr (born 1965 in Hamburg), retired German curler
 Line Jahr (born 1984), Norwegian ski jumper
 Peter Jahr (born 1959), German politician and member of the European Parliament from Germany

Other uses 
 Das Jahr (The Year), an 1841 a cycle of pieces by Fanny Mendelssohn

See also 
 Jahren (disambiguation)
 Jar (disambiguation)